Pencak silat competition at the 2018 Asian Games was held in Jakarta, Indonesia from 23 to 29 August 2018 at Pencak Silat Arena (Padepokan) inside the Taman Mini Indonesia Indah in East Jakarta. This sport is popular in Southeast Asia. Hosts Indonesia won 14 out of the 16 gold medals, and Vietnam won the remaining two.

Schedule

Medalists

Men's seni

Men's tanding

Women's seni

Women's tanding

Medal table

Participating nations
A total of 166 athletes from 16 nations competed in pencak silat at the 2018 Asian Games:

References

External links
Official website
Official Result Book – Pencak Silat

 
2018 Asian Games events
2018